Halima Embarek Warzazi (born 1933) is a Moroccan diplomat and human rights activist, who has had a long career with the United Nations.

References

1933 births
Living people
Moroccan diplomats
Moroccan women diplomats
Moroccan human rights activists
Moroccan women activists
Moroccan officials of the United Nations